Road toll may refer to:

 Road toll (modern), a fee for use of roads today
 Road toll (historical), a historic fee for the use of roads
 Road toll (Australia and New Zealand), the death toll on Australasian roads